The 199th Fighter Squadron (199 FS) is a unit of the Hawaii Air National Guard 154th Wing located at Joint Base Pearl Harbor–Hickam, Honolulu, Hawaii. The 199th is equipped with the F-22A Raptor.

Overview
The 199th Fighter Squadron is a unit of the 154th Wing. They operate the F-22A Raptor, the Air Force's 5th generation fighter aircraft with a select component of active duty personnel acting in the cadre role. Its combination of stealth, supercruise, maneuverability and integrated avionics, coupled with improved supportability, represents an exponential leap in warfighting capabilities. The Raptor performs both air-to-air and air-to-ground missions allowing full realization of operational concepts vital to the 21st-century Air Force.

History

World War II
Established in late 1944 at Peterson Field, Colorado, as the 464th Fighter Squadron.  Trained under XXII Bomber Command  as a Very Long Range P-47N Thunderbolt bomber escort squadron, programmed for B-29 Superfortress escort duty from Okinawa.  For four months they received combat training for long-range escort, strafing, and dive-bombing. Training delayed due to P-47N aircraft non-availability, finally equipped in the late spring of 1945 with the long-distance fighters.

Deployed to Okinawa in June 1945 as part of the 507th Fighter Group and prepared for the invasion of Japan along with the 413th and 414th Fighter Groups, all equipped with P-47N.  On 1 July 1945 it began flying airstrikes from Ie Shima, targeting enemy ships, railroad bridges, airfields, factories, and barracks in Japan, Korea, and China. On 8 August 1945 the group escorted B-29 bombers on a raid, shooting down several Japanese fighters.

The squadron flew some long distance fighter-bomber sweeps over Japanese Home Islands 1 July 1945 – 14 August 1945 but never performed operational B-29 escort missions due to the end of the war in August.  Last "Ace in a Day" of World War II was 1st LT Oscar Perdomo of the 464th.

Remained in Okinawa until inactivated in May 1946.

Hawaii Air National Guard

The wartime 463d Fighter Squadron was re-designated as the 199th Fighter Squadron, and was allotted to the Hawaii Air National Guard, on 24 May 1946. It was organized at Bellows Field, Waimanalo, Hawaii, and was extended federal recognition on 4 November 1946 by the National Guard Bureau. The 199th Fighter Squadron was bestowed the lineage, history, honors, and colors of the 463d Fighter Squadron. The squadron was equipped with F-47N Thunderbolts and was operationally gained by Seventh Air Force. Its mission was the air defense of Hawaii.

Bellows Field, which was attacked during the 7 December 1941 Japanese attack on Oahu, was excess after World War II ended, and it served as home for the Hawaii Air National Guard.

In 1947, the costs to operate Bellows as an active Air National Guard station led the Territorial government to negotiate with the Army about its future.  The Army indicated that it wanted to retain the field in a commissioned status but that it had no funds to maintain the field.  The Army offered the Aviation Unit of the Hawaiian National Guard joint use of the field provided all maintenance was assumed by the Guard.  A settlement was reached to move the 199th to Hickam Field, and to use excess facilities there.

Air Defense mission

The Very-Long-Range (VLR) F-47N was used for air defense patrols over the Islands and had a range which could extend its interception ability over a thousand miles from Hickam.  The 199th was not federalized during the Korean War, however many of its members volunteered to serve.

The 199th joined the jet age in 1954 when it finally retired its aging Thunderbolts for F-86E Sabre day fighters that were made available after serving in combat over the skies of Korea.  The squadron stood runway alert as part of the air defense forces in Hawaii beginning in 1954, having alert pilots in the cockpit from 30 minutes before sunrise to 30 minutes after sunset each day.  Beginning in 1958, the squadron received F-86L Sabre Interceptors which could be controlled by Ground Control Interceptor station radar and could operate 24/7/365 in all weather conditions.

On 1 December 1960, the 199th was authorized to expand to a group level, and the 154th Fighter-Interceptor Group was established by the National Guard Bureau. The 199th FIS becoming the group's flying squadron. Other squadrons assigned into the group were the 154th Headquarters, 154th Material Squadron (Maintenance), 154th Combat Support Squadron, and the 154th USAF Dispensary.

Along with the change to Group status, on 7 December the Hawaiian Air National Guard began receiving Mach-1 F-102 Delta Dagger interceptors eventually 29 F-102s were received.  This was in line with the policy of equipping ANG units with one generation of aircraft behind the active-duty Air Defense Command forces.  For the next sixteen years, the 154th FIG operated the Delta Daggers establishing an excellent safety record.  In December 1961, The new Hawaii Air National Guard (HANG) complex was completed and consisted of 60 acres.  The land was originally part of Fort Kamehameha and had been acquired in 1960 by permit from the U.S. Army to the Hawaii ANG.

The 154th flew the Delta Dagger throughout the 1960s, and although the Hawaii ANG was not activated during the Vietnam War, several of its pilots volunteered for combat duty in Southeast Asia.  The group was the longest user of the interceptor, being equipped with the F-102 long after most of its Air National Guard counterparts were upgraded to the F-106.

Tactical fighters

The last F-102A finally left ANG service in October 1976, when the 199th FIS of the Hawaii ANG traded in their Delta Daggers for F-4C Phantom II and the 154th became a Tactical Fighter Group.  The F-4C was a workhorse tactical fighter-bomber during the Vietnam War, and could also be used as an effective interceptor.  The Hawaii ANG used the Phantom in both roles, employing it during training exercises with Army and Marine units in ground exercises, as well as retaining the standing air defense alert at Hickam.  On 3 November 1978, the 154th became a Composite Group with the addition of a C-130A Hercules and a C-7A Caribou flight

After a decade flying the F-4C, the 154th received F-15A Eagles in 1987 along with a twin-seat F-15B trainer as part of the retirement of the F-4 from the Air Force inventory.  The F-15As were received from the 21st Tactical Fighter Wing, Elmendorf AFB, Alaska, which was upgrading to the F-15C model.  The Eagles received from Alaska had been upgraded though the F-15 Multi-Stage Improvement Program (MSIP) and were used in an air defense mission, which the Hawaii ANG had taken over.  In mid-1991, early F-15C versions were received, and the Hawaii ANG operated both the A and C models of the Eagle for the next two decades.

In 1989 with inactivation of the PACAF 326th Air Division, the 154th Composite Group took over the air defense Radar mission in Hawaii.  The 169th Aircraft Control and Warning Squadron began operating a JSS radar site at Mount Kaala, Oahu along with the FAA, and the 150th Aircraft Control and Warning Flight operates a joint-use JSS radar site at Kokee Air Force Station, Kauai. These radar sites are linked to the NORAD Hawaii Region Air Operations Center (HIRAOC) at Wheeler Army Airfield, Oahu, .  With these two sites, 24/7 air surveillance of the Hawaiian island chain is provided.  The 154th Aircraft Control Squadron on Kauai also provides a mobile, self-sustainable, combat ready, forward extension and control element equipped to meet the Air Force's ground theater air control systems.

Modern era
In March 1992, with the end of the Cold War, the 154th adopted the Air Force Objective Organization plan, and the unit was re-designated as the 154th Group.  In January 1993, the 203d Air Refueling Squadron was recognized and activated by the National Guard Bureau.  The 203d assumed the rotating deployments of KC-135s to Hickam which started in the 1970s by SAC-gained stateside Air National Guard squadrons.  On 1 August 1994 the C-130 flight was expanded and the 204th Airlift Squadron was recognized and activated by the National Guard Bureau.

In 1995, in accordance with the Air Force "One Base-One Wing" directive, the 155th was changed in status to a Wing, and the 199th Fighter Squadron was assigned to the new 154th Operations Group.

In July 2010, the Hawaii Air National Guard welcomed the first of its new inventory of F-22A Raptors.  The 154th Wing was the second ANG unit to be equipped with the F-22. The 199th is planned to have 20 aircraft, the initial aircraft being transferred from the 325th Fighter Wing, Tyndall Air Force Base, Florida; the remaining 18 aircraft will come from the 1st Fighter Wing, Langley Air Force Base, Virginia.

The F-22 is designed to counter advanced surface-to-air missile systems and next-generation fighters equipped with launch-and-leave missile capability.  The F-15s were sent to the boneyard, the last Eagle leaving in 2011.  The 199th operates with the active-duty 19th Fighter Squadron as their cadre unit, although the Hawaii ANG is responsible for seventy-five percent of the mission configuration.  This is the first time an Air National Guard unit, the 199th Fighter Squadron, has taken the position of only having an active duty squadron as a cadre flying unit.

Lineage

 Constituted as the 464th Fighter Squadron on 5 October 1944
 Activated on 12 October 1944
 Inactivated on 27 May 1946
 Redesignated 199th Fighter Squadron, Single Engine and allotted to the National Guard on 24 May 1946.
 Received federal recognition and activated on 4 November 1946
 Redesignated 199th Fighter-Bomber Squadron on 15 July 1952
 Redesignated 199th Fighter-Interceptor Squadron on 19 November 1952
 Redesignated 199th Tactical Fighter Squadron on 10 June 1976
 Redesignated 199th Fighter Squadron on 15 March 1992

Assignments
 507th Fighter Group, 12 October 1944 – 27 May 1946
 Hawaii Air National Guard, 4 November 1946
 Gained by: Seventh Air Force
 Gained by: Pacific Air Command, 15 December 1947
 Gained by: Far East Air Forces, 1 June 1949
 Gained by: Seventh Air Force, 5 January 1955
 Gained by: Pacific Air Forces, 1 July 1957
 154th Fighter-Interceptor Group, 1 December 1960
 154th Tactical Fighter Group, 10 June 1976
 154th Composite Group, 3 November 1978
 154th Group, 15 March 1992
 154th Operations Group, 1 October 1995 – present

Stations

 Bruning Army Airfield, Nebraska, 20 October 1944
 Dalhart Army Air Field, Texas, 15 December 1944 – 30 April 1945
 Ie Shima Airfield, Ryuku Islands, 24 June 1945
 Yontan Airfield, Okinawa, 29 January-27 May 1946

 Bellows Field. Hawaii, 4 November 1946
 Hickam Air Force Base (later Joint Base Pearl Harbor–Hickam), Hawaii, 28 October 1947

Aircraft

 P-47N Thunderbolt, 1944–1945
 F-47N Thunderbolt, 1947–1954
 F-86E Sabre, 1954–1958
 F-86L Sabre Interceptor, 1958–1961
 F-102A Delta Dagger, 1960–1976

 F-4C Phantom II, 1976–1987
 F-15A/B Eagle, 1987–2009
 F-15C Eagle, 1991–2010
 F-22A Raptor, 2010 – present

References

 154th Wing website
 Maurer, Maurer. Combat Squadrons of the Air Force: World War II. Maxwell Air Force Base, Alabama: Office of Air Force History, 1982.
 Rogers, B. (2006). United States Air Force Unit Designations Since 1978. 
 199th Fighter Squadron lineage and history
 Hawaii Aviation
 Hawaii ANG Dedicates its first F-22 Raptors

External links

Squadrons of the United States Air National Guard
Fighter squadrons of the United States Air Force
Military units and formations in Hawaii